Premila Kumar is a Fijian politician and Member of the Parliament of Fiji. She served as Minister for Education, Heritage and Arts from 2020 to 2022 and also for Local Government, Housing and Community Development from 2018 to 2022

Kumar's diverse professional life has spanned across industries and shaped her perspective –– one that is driven by both the empowerment and protection of ordinary Fijians. Starting her career as a biology and chemistry teacher, she quickly rose through the ranks of the education sector before transitioning to policy, serving as a Government environmental advocate, and later, an investment manager at Fiji Islands Trade & Investment Bureau (now Investment Fiji). She then moved on to become the Chief Executive Officer of the Consumer Council of Fiji, a leadership role that she held for over 12 years –– rightfully earning her the reputation of a staunch consumer advocate throughout Fiji and the Pacific. 

As its longstanding CEO, Kumar transformed the Council into a high-profile powerhouse for consumer rights. She quickly became known for boldly and directly taking on challenges on behalf of Fijian families, and effectively fighting for meaningful change by lobbying Government to break up business practices that she uncovered to be unethical and lacking transparency. Notably, she led recent groundbreaking campaigns on accident compensation, restaurant grading, and affordable housing and medication, to name just a few. As the Minister for Industry, Trade & Tourism, she planned to continue this mission, now armed with the power to lead and institute policy reform from the front lines. Today, her work continues to be rooted by her mantra, "I am not against business, but against bad business."  
As the head of the realigned Ministry of Housing & Community Development, Ms. Kumar leveraged her extensive experience with landlord-tenant issues as a powerful proponent of affordable housing throughout Fiji, particularly in the nation's quickly-growing urban and peri-urban areas. Her background in environmentalism and sustainable development is progressing Government's mission to make Fijian communities more resilient to the effects of a changing climate.

Within the Ministry of Local Government, Kumar worked to replicate the newfound transparency and accountability she brought to Fiji's businesses in the nation's many municipalities, pressing for a CEO-mentality from community leaders that will ensure every dollar of taxpayer money is both prudently allocated and accounted for.

In the international arena, Kumar has continuously supported Consumers International's (CI) global work, and she has expanded Fiji's regional leadership by offering consumer affairs support, expertise, and training to Fiji's Pacific Island neighbours such as Vanuatu, Tonga and Kiribati. She was a member of the ACP-EU Follow-up Committee of the European Economic and Social Committee (EESC) from November 2015 to April 2018, and a Council member of Consumers International. 

Kumar was honoured with the Executive Woman of the Year Award in 2015 by Women in Business, and the Fiji Times named her Most Influential Woman of the Year in 2010. She has also served on various Boards and Committees.

Premila obtained her Master of Science degree in the area of Trade and Environment (with Distinction) from the Netherlands. She also has a Bachelor of Science degree (First Division) from India, Post Graduate Diploma in Biology and Post Graduate Certificate in Education from the University of the South Pacific.  

She is married to Jaindra Karan, and they have three children, two sons and a daughter.

References

Indian members of the Parliament of Fiji
FijiFirst politicians
Government ministers of Fiji
Fijian civil servants
Fijian educators
Fijian environmentalists
21st-century Fijian women politicians
21st-century Fijian politicians
Women government ministers of Fiji
Year of birth missing (living people)
Living people